Schwabsberg station is a railway stop on the Upper Jagst Railway in the municipality of Rainau, located in the Ostalbkreis district in Baden-Württemberg, Germany.

References 

Railway stations in Baden-Württemberg
Buildings and structures in Ostalbkreis